Schriever Space Force Base, previously Schriever Air Force Base, Falcon Air Force Base, and Falcon Air Force Station, is a base of the United States Space Force located approximately  east of Space Base Delta 1 near Colorado Springs in El Paso County, Colorado, United States.

History 
 Source: USAF Schriever AFB  

Groundbreaking for what would become Schriever Air Force Base took place in May 1983. It was originally called the Consolidated Space Operations Center (CSOC) during the development phase, and was renamed Falcon Air Force Station upon becoming operational. In July 1985, the 2nd Space Wing was activated at Peterson AFB and in September 1985, the organization relocated to Falcon Air Force Station, and 230 Air Force members, civilian employees, and contractors moved into its 12 new buildings. This wing took operational control of the Air Force Satellite Control Network in a phased system turn over that began in October 1987 and lasted several years.

In June 1988, Falcon Air Force Station was redesignated Falcon Air Force Base. On 30 January 1992, the 2nd Space Wing inactivated and the 50th Tactical Fighter Wing, redesignated as the 50th Space Wing, activated at Falcon AFB.

On 5 June 1998, Falcon Air Force Base was renamed Schriever Air Force Base in honor of the retired General Bernard Adolph Schriever, who pioneered in the development of the American ballistic missile programs. Schriever AFB was the only Air Force base that was named for an Air Force veteran who was living at the time. General Schriever died 20 June 2005.

On 26 July 2021, the base was renamed Schriever Space Force Base to reflect its role in the new Space Force mission.

Role and operations 
This Space Force Base is named in honor of General Bernard Adolph Schriever, who pioneered in the development of the American ballistic missile programs. It is the home of the 50th Space Wing of the United States Space Force, and this base provides command and control for over 170  Department of Defense warning, navigational, and communications satellites.

Also housed at Schriever SFB are the Missile Defense Integration and Operations Center and the U.S. Air Force Warfare Center. Building 400 at Schriever SFB is the main control point for the Global Positioning System (GPS).

Schriever is staffed by more than 8,100 active duty and guard/reserve personnel, civilian employees, and contractors.

Based units 
Notable units based at Schriever Space Force Base.

Units marked GSU are Geographically Separate Units, which although based at Schriever, are subordinate to a parent unit based at another location.

United States Space Force 
Space Base Delta 1
 50th Mission Support Group
 50th Civil Engineer Squadron
 50th Contracting Squadron
 50th Force Support Squadron
 50th Logistics Readiness Flight
 50th Security Forces Squadron
 50th Space Communications Squadron

 21st Medical Group
 21st Medical Squadron (GSU)

Space Operations Command (SpOC)
 Space Delta 6
 1st Cyber Operations Squadron
 2nd Cyber Operations Squadron
 22nd Space Operations Squadron

 Space Delta 8
2nd Space Operations Squadron
4th Space Operations Squadron
10th Space Operations Squadron (GSU)
 50th Operations Support Squadron

 Space Delta 9
 1st Space Operations Squadron
 3rd Space Operations Squadron
 Delta 9 Operations Support Squadron
 Detachment 1

Space Training and Readiness Command (STARCOM)
 Space Delta 11
 25th Space Range Squadron
 527th Space Aggressor Squadron

 Space Delta 12
 1st Test and Evaluation Squadron
 3rd Test and Evaluation Squadron
 4th Test and Evaluation Squadron
 12th Delta Operations Squadron
 17th Test and Evaluation Squadron

United States Air Force 
Air Combat Command (ACC)
 Sixteenth Air Force
 Air Force Technical Applications Center
 Detachment 46 (GSU)

Air Force Reserve Command (AFRC)
 Tenth Air Force 
 310th Space Wing
 Headquarters 310th Space Wing
 310th Operations Group
 6th Space Operations Squadron
 7th Space Operations Squadron
 19th Space Operations Squadron
 310th Operations Support Squadron
 310th Security Forces Squadron
 310th Mission Support Group
 310th Security Forces Squadron
 310th Force Support Squadron
 310th Communications Flight
 710th Operations Group
 8th Space Warning Squadron
 Detachment 1 (GSU)

 926th Wing
 926th Operations Group
 14th Test Squadron (GSU)
 26th Space Aggressor Squadron (GSU)
 379th Space Range Squadron (GSU)

United States Army 
Colorado Army National Guard
 100th Missile Defense Brigade

United States Navy 
US Naval Observatory
 USNO Alternate Master Clock

Department of Defense 
United States Space Command
 Joint Task Force–Space Defense
 National Space Defense Center

United States Strategic Command
 Joint Functional Component Command for Integrated Missile Defense

Missile Defense Agency 
 Missile Defense Integration and Operations Center

National Reconnaissance Office 
 NRO Operations Squadron

See also 

 Communications satellites
 Milstar
 Satellite navigation systems
 SolarStrong
 Space Test and Training Range

References

External links 

 Schriever Air Force Base website
 History of Schriever Air Force Base
 Schriever AFB Installation Overview from AirForceUSA.org.

Installations of the United States Air Force in Colorado
Buildings and structures in El Paso County, Colorado
Economy of Colorado Springs, Colorado
1985 establishments in Colorado
Military installations established in 1985
Military installations in Colorado